Michael Elmo James (born August 15, 1967) is an American former professional baseball player who pitched in Major League Baseball (MLB) from 1995 to 2002.

External links

1967 births
Living people
Albuquerque Dukes players
American expatriate baseball players in Canada
Bakersfield Dodgers players
Baseball players from Florida
California Angels players
Colorado Rockies players
Colorado Springs Sky Sox players
Edmonton Trappers players
Great Falls Dodgers players
Lake Elsinore Storm players
Major League Baseball pitchers
Memphis Redbirds players
People from Fort Walton Beach, Florida
San Antonio Missions players
St. Louis Cardinals players
Vancouver Canadians players
Vero Beach Dodgers players
Junior college baseball players in the United States